Jukka Mäkynen (born 27 April 1961, in Vaasa) is a Finnish politician currently serving in the Parliament of Finland for the Finns Party at the Vaasa constituency. Mäkynen is also a member of the Vaasa city council.

In 2015, Mäkynen was convicted to a five month-long conditional prison sentence for defrauding his mother. In 2017, Mäkynen was also convicted for assault and had to pay compensation to the victim. Due to non-payment, the compensation eventually had to be taken from his parliamentary salary by a public debt collector.

References

1961 births
Living people
People from Vaasa
Finns Party politicians
Members of the Parliament of Finland (2019–23)